Llanbrynmair railway station was a railway station on the Newtown and Machynlleth Railway (N&MR) in Mid-Wales, serving the village of Llanbrynmair.

Llanbrynmair shut under the Beeching Axe in 1965, although the station building itself remains today as a private house.

After a fatality in October 1999, the adjacent level crossing was closed and the road was diverted.

References

Sources

Former Cambrian Railway stations
Railway stations in Great Britain opened in 1863
Disused railway stations in Powys
Railway stations in Great Britain closed in 1965
Beeching closures in Wales
Grade II listed buildings in Powys
Grade II listed railway stations in Wales